Los Ángeles were a Spanish pop group active 1963-1976. Originally the band was known as Los Ángeles Azules (The Blue Angels), the "Azules" was dropped when contracted by Hispavox, a major Spanish label, in 1967.

On September 26, 1976, the band were on their way to Madrid after playing in Tarragona the previous day. The car, which was carrying Poncho Gonzalez (drummer) and Jose Luis Avellaneda (guitarist), crashed in Motilla del Palancar, killing both band members. Carlos Alvarez, the other guitarist, suffered serious injuries that would keep him hospitalized for a long time. The bassist, Paco Quero, also survived.

Discography
 Los Ángeles (1967)
 Pequeñas cosas (1972)

Singles
 98.6
 Dime, dime
 Mañana, mañana
 Créeme
 Momentos
 Mónica
 Abre tu ventana
 Raquel
 Nada va a cambiar el mundo
 Quiero que seas tú
 Pequeñas cosas

References

Spanish musical groups